Rodney Scott Childers (born June 7, 1976) is an American NASCAR Cup Series crew chief and former professional stock car racing driver. He is currently employed at Stewart-Haas Racing as the crew chief for the No. 4 Ford Mustang, driven by Kevin Harvick, winner of the 2014 NASCAR Sprint Cup Series championship.

Career
Rodney Childers was born in Mooresville, North Carolina. Before becoming crew chief, Childers himself was a racer, competing in the World Karting Association when he was 12 years old. He won seven championships in the state of South Carolina and five championships at the national level before moving to the Late Model Stock Car division in 1997. From 1999 to 2002 he competed in the NASCAR Slim Jim All Pro Series and the Hooters Pro Cup Series. In 2000, Childers made his Busch Series debut at Myrtle Beach Speedway, driving the No. 49 Chevrolet Monte Carlo for Jay Robinson Racing.

Childers retired from driving in 2003 to concentrate on becoming a mechanic. He first worked with Penske-Jasper Racing as a mechanic for the No. 77 Dodge, before becoming car chief. In June 2005, Childers was named Scott Riggs' crew chief at MB2/MBV Motorsports for the rest of the season, where Riggs scored two top-fives and four top-10 finishes. He moved with Riggs to Evernham Motorsports at the start of the 2006 season, and stayed with him until October 2007, when he became Elliott Sadler's crew chief at Evernham. He stayed with Sadler until the end of 2008, when he moved to Michael Waltrip Racing.

Childers used to own a 1967 Shelby Mustang GT500. It was given to him by MWR co-owner Robert "Rob" Kauffman after he and driver David Reutimann won the 2009 Coca-Cola 600. Reutimann also received a Mustang from Kauffman. Childers repeated the talents they used to win the Coca-Cola 600 to win Reutimann an upset Cup victory at Chicago. After Reutimann went winless in 2011, he was replaced by Mark Martin and one of Childers' lifelong friends, Brian Vickers. Childers and the team was renumbered to 55. Vickers won the No. 55 team a victory at Loudon.

On August 23, 2013, despite the Loudon win, Childers announced that he was leaving MWR to become Kevin Harvick's crew chief at Stewart-Haas Racing in 2014. Childers was released from his crew chief duties by MWR following the 2013 Irwin Tools Night Race, but remained under contract for the remainder of the season.

Harvick and Childers combined to win the 2014 NASCAR Sprint Cup Series title. Since the title reign, the duo have been consistent in finishing within the NASCAR playoffs. The two have combined to win 36 points races, 25 poles and one All-Star race win since the start of the No. 4 team.

On October 5, 2022, Childers was suspended for four races and fined 100,000 for an L2 Penalty during post-race inspection after the Talladega playoff race. The penalty came under Sections 14.1 (vehicle assembly) and 14.5 (body) in the NASCAR Rule Book, both of which pertain to the body and overall vehicle assembly rules surrounding modification of a single-source supplied part. In addition, the No. 4 team was docked 100 driver and owner points.

Motorsports career results

NASCAR
(key) (Bold – Pole position awarded by qualifying time. Italics – Pole position earned by points standings or practice time. * – Most laps led.)

Busch Series

References

External links
 
 

1976 births
Living people
People from Mooresville, North Carolina
Racing drivers from North Carolina
American Speed Association drivers
NASCAR crew chiefs
NASCAR drivers
CARS Tour drivers